Inger Pia-Lena Nilsson (born 31 March 1962) is a Swedish Social Democratic politician. She has been a member of the Riksdag since 2004. She is currently taking up seat number 23 for Värmland County constituency. She has been a member of the municipal concil of Sala Municipality since 1985. She has also been a member of the municipal board of the municipality from 1994 up until 2004.

Biography 
Inger Pia-Lena Nilsson was born on 31 March 1965, to Bo Nilsson, a metal worker, and Inger Nilsson (née Thunberg), a nurse. She grew up in Sala and went to high-school there, where she studied social science and graduated in 1981. After she finished high-school she started working as a cashier (shop assistant) from 1981 until 1984. Nilson later attended Örebro University from 1989 until 1992 and graduated with a Bachelor's degree and a degree in information and communications technology. During the same time as she was studying at Örebro University, she was working as a substitute teacher from 1989 until 1992. Nilson also has worked as an Information Assistant from 1992 until 1994. After she stopped working as an Information Assistant, Nilson started working as a Swedish as a second language teacher from 1994 until 1997. She later began studying literature at Mälardalen University College from 1997 until 1998 and again in 2004 until 2005, during the time she was studying she was also working as a Swedish teacher from 1997 until 2004.

Political Missions

Missions in the Riksdag 
Since 2018 general election Nilsson has been a member of the Education Committee, as well as an alternate for the European Union Affairs Committee. She has also been a member of the Law Committee from 2005 until 2006, the Transport and Communications Committee from 2006 until 2018, and the Finance Committee from 2011 until 2014. She has as also been a member of The Riksdag Board from October 2010 until February 2012, The Election Review Board from April 2011 to February 2015, and the War delegation from October 2014 until October 2018.

Missions in the Social Democratic Party 
Nilsson is also a member of the Board for the Social Democratic party since 2007. Nilsson is also a member of the district board of Västmanland.

Other Missions 
Nilsson is also an alternate for the Bank of Sweden Tercentenary Foundation.

Personal life 
Nilson lives in Sala with her partner and her teenage daughter.

References 

Members of the Riksdag from the Social Democrats
Living people
1962 births
Women members of the Riksdag
Members of the Riksdag 2002–2006
21st-century Swedish women politicians